The 2008 Skåne County earthquake occurred at 06.20am CET (05.20 UTC) on 16 December and affected the southern part of Sweden and eastern parts of Denmark. The epicenter was 5 km southwest of Sjöbo and 60 km east of Malmö. The earthquake was considered "moderately strong" with a moment magnitude calculated at 4.2–4.3 . Strong shaking was reported widely in Sweden from Skåne to Östergötland, in Denmark, and in northern Poland. The Skåne region is known for extremely low seismic activity, with only three small earthquakes (each less than 2.8) detected between 1970 and 2008, and only 14 earthquakes since 1375. Roadways in Sweden and Denmark were reported with cracks but investigations did not determine if any were caused by the earthquake.

See also 
List of earthquakes in 2008
Geology of Sweden

References

External links 
Earthquake Information, European-Mediterranean Seismological Centre

2008 earthquakes
Earthquakes in Sweden
Earthquakes in Denmark
2008 in Sweden
2008 in Denmark
21st century in Skåne County
December 2008 events in Europe
2008 disasters in Sweden
2008 disasters in Denmark